Peter Berndtsson (born January 28, 1965) is a Swedish retired ice hockey centre. He spent ten seasons with Västra Frölunda from 1989 to 1996 and then again from 1997 to 2000.  He also played for Färjestads BK, Örebro IK, HV 71 and Linköpings HC and also had a spell in Finland's SM-liiga for JYP.

References

External links

1965 births
Färjestad BK players
Frölunda HC players
HV71 players
JYP Jyväskylä players
Linköping HC players
Living people
Swedish ice hockey centres